
Amarone is a restaurant in Rotterdam, Netherlands. It is a fine dining restaurant that is awarded one Michelin star in the period 2008–present.

The owner and Head chef of Amarone is Jan van Dobben. Chef van Dobben worked together with Gert Blom for 6 years. 
Mr. van Dobben became the co-owner of the restaurant in 2017. 1 year later, in July 2018, he completely took over the restaurant from Mr Blom.  
Chef van Dobben remained, together with his wife, Yoshiko Takayama-van Dobben, Restaurant-manager Jasper Verhagen and Sous-chef Yuri Wattimena, his Michelin-star in December 2018.

GaultMillau awarded the restaurant in 2019 with 15 out of 20 points.

In 2019, Restaurant Amarone situated on the 60th place in the "Lekker 500" 

On August 22, 2019, Amarone had to close its doors after a major fire. There was a short circuit in a wall socket in the basement. After a renovation, the restaurant reopened on February 21, 2020.

See also
List of Michelin starred restaurants in the Netherlands

References 

Restaurants in Rotterdam
Michelin Guide starred restaurants in the Netherlands